A cripple is a person or animal with a physical disability; the term is now pejorative when referring to a person.

Cripple may also refer to:

Software
 Crippleware, a type of shareware or freeware that lacks full functionality

Mass media
 Cripple Clarence Lofton (1887–1957), blues artist
 "Crippled Inside", a 1971 song by John Lennon on the album Imagine
 The Crippled Masters, a 1979 kung-fu film
 The Cripple of Inishmaan, a 1997 Irish play
 Crippled Lucifer, a 1998 album by Burning Witch
 "Cripple Fight", a 2001 episode of South Park
 Hooky the Cripple, a 2002 novel by Chopper Read
 Cripple Crow, a 2005 album by Devendra Banhart
 Cripple Need Cane, a rock band from Los Angeles

See also
 Cripple Creek (disambiguation)